Simplicity is the state or quality of being simple.

Simplicity may also refer to:

Business
 Simplicity Manufacturing Company, a defunct American manufacturer of lawn and garden tractors
 Simplicity Pattern, an American sewing pattern company

Technology
 Simplicity, a smart contract programming language

Music
 Simplicity (The Bouncing Souls album), 2016
 Simplicity (Jaws album), 2016
 Simplicity (Joe Pass album) or the title song, 1967
 Simplicity (Tesla album), 2014
 Simplicity (Tim Curry album) or the title song, 1981
 Simplicity, an EP by Aril Brikha, 2003
 "Simplicity", a song by Gorillaz from Song Machine, Season One: Strange Timez, 2014

Other uses
 Simplicity (photography), a photographic technique
 Simplicity Hill, in the Queen Maud Mountains, Antarctica
 USS Simplicity (SP-96), a United States Navy patrol boat 1917–1918
 Simplicity, a variant of the solitaire card game Four Seasons

See also
 
 
 Simple (disambiguation)
 Simply (disambiguation)